Francisco López de Zúñiga y Meneses, 2nd Marquess of Baides and Count of Pedrosa (Villa de Pedrosa, Spain; 1599–1655) was a Spanish soldier who served as Royal Governor of Chile from May 1639 to May 1646.

The son of Francisco López de Zúñiga y de la Cerda and María Meneses y Padilla. López de Zúñiga was a knight of the Order of Santiago and Count of Pedrosa.  He was married to María de Salazar in 1636.

For 16 years he served in the Spanish army, fighting in Flanders and Germany.  In 1639 he was named Governor of the Captaincy General of Chile.  During his rule, corruption flourished.  However he liked the Jesuits and admired Fr. Luis de Valdivia, and he brought gifts to make a new agreement with the natives. In 1641 he held the Parliament of Quillin, in the Quillin River valley, with the toqui Lincopinchon and established the first peace in the Arauco War with the indigenous Mapuche people. Nevertheless, a year later the Spaniards began using the military to put down uprisings.

At the end of his term he embarked on a Spanish armada departing from Callao, Peru on its way back to Spain.  Although he lived to see his son born during the voyage, the fleet was attacked by an English squadron while within sight of Cadiz, Spain, and López de Zúñiga was killed in this Battle of Cádiz (1656), as was his wife and one of his daughters.

Sources

1599 births
1655 deaths
Royal Governors of Chile
Counts of Spain
Marquesses of Spain
Knights of Santiago
Spanish generals
17th-century Spanish military personnel
17th-century Spanish nobility